The 2016 Euroleague Final Four was the concluding EuroLeague Final Four tournament of the 2015–16 Euroleague season, which was the 59th season of Europe's premier club basketball tournament, and the 16th season since it has been organised by Euroleague Basketball. The Final Four was played at the Mercedes-Benz Arena, in Berlin, Germany, in May 2016. CSKA Moscow won its 7th EuroLeague title, after beating Fenerbahçe in the championship game, by a score of 101–96, in overtime.

Venue 
On May 11, 2015, Euroleague Basketball announced that the 2016 Final Four would be played at the Mercedes-Benz Arena, in Berlin, Germany. With a seating capacity of 14,500 people for basketball games, it is home to the Alba Berlin basketball team, and is used for ice hockey, basketball, and handball games, as well as concerts. The area surrounding the arena is filled with various entertainment venues, including a cinema, a casino, a hotel, and various bars and restaurants. The arena previously hosted the 2009 Euroleague Final Four. The arena was one of the most prominent elements of the Mediaspree urban redevelopment project, and it quickly gained emblematic status in the debates surrounding the project's impact.

Light pixels, consisting of two groups of 19 LEDs (colour palette: 16.7 million RGB colours), were attached to the vertical bracing of the facade.

Road to the Final Four

Bracket

Semifinals

Semifinal A

Semifinal B

Third place game

Championship game 
The Final was the second Final Four meeting between the two teams. In the 2015 Euroleague Final Four, CSKA Moscow beat Fenerbahçe 86–80, in the third-place game. It was the first European final for Fenerbahçe, while CSKA played in its 13th championship game.

In the Final, it seemed early on that CSKA was destined to win its seventh EuroLeague title. After a strong first half, the Russian side led 30–50 at halftime, and had a lead of as many as 21 points in the third quarter. However, in the fourth quarter, Fenerbahçe surged back, and CSKA player, Victor Khryapa, had to score a tip-in with 1.9 seconds remaining on the game clock, to tie the game. It was the third Final in EuroLeague history that went to overtime. In overtime, CSKA, led by Nando De Colo, took the lead, and finally claimed its seventh EuroLeague title, and its first one in eight years.

Final Four MVP

See also 
 2016 Eurocup Finals
 2016 FIBA Europe Cup Final Four

References

External links 
 Official website

Final Four
2016
Sports competitions in Berlin
International basketball competitions hosted by Germany
2016 in Berlin
2015–16 in German basketball
2015–16 in Spanish basketball
2015–16 in Turkish basketball
2015–16 in Russian basketball